Welcome to the Club may refer to:

Welcome to the Club (The Simpsons), 2022 American animated short film based on The Simpsons, released on Disney+
Welcome to the Club (musical), a 1989 Broadway musical with music and lyrics by Cy Coleman
Welcome to the Club (film), 1971 American comedy film
Welcome to the Club (Ian Hunter album)
Welcome to the Club (Nat King Cole album)
 "Welcome to the Club", the title track written by Noel Sherman and Dick Wolf
Welcome to the Club (Kick Axe album)
"Welcome to the Club", a song by The Brothers Johnson from the album Blast!: The Latest and the Greatest
"Welcome to the Club", a song by Tim McGraw on his self-titled debut album
"Welcome to the Club", a song by Vandenberg from their album Heading for a Storm, 1983
"Welcome to the Club", a song by Joe Walsh on his album, So What
"Welcome to the Club", a song by DJ Manian
Welcome to the Club (Fear the Walking Dead), an episode of the television series Fear the Walking Dead